A ținut (pl. ținuturi; sometimes translated in English as "region", "district" or "municipality") were the traditional subdivision of the Principality of Moldavia (1359–1859).

Principality of Moldavia (late 14th century – 1859) 

Lower Country (Țara de Jos)

Iași County
Cârligătura County (later merged with Iași County)
Roman County
Vaslui County
Tutova County

Bârlad County (later merged with Tutova County)
Tecuci County
Horincea County (later merged with Covurlui County)
Covurlui County
Putna County

Adjud County (later merged with Putna County)
Fălciu County
Soroca County
Orhei County
Lăpușna County

Upper Country (Țara de Sus)

Hotin County
Cernăuți County
Dorohoi County

Suceava County
Neamț County
Hârlău County (later Botoșani County)

Bacău County
Trotuș County (later merged with Bacău County)
Câmpulung County

Historic Bessarabia (Basarabia)

Cetatea Albă County
Chilia County

Tigheciu County
Tighina County

Southern Bessarabia (Sudul Basarabiei)

Cahul County
Bolgrad County
Ismail County

See also
 Administrative divisions of Romania
 Administrative divisions of Moldova

References

Further reading
 Dimitrie Cantemir, "Descriptio Molaviae", 1737
 Ion Nistor, "Istoria Basarabiei", 1923, reprinted 1991
 Portretul Romaniei interbelice

Counties
Counties
Counties
 
Moldavia